Pangda (庞达村) is a village just east of the Doklam plateau and approximately 10 km east of the India-Bhutan-China trijunction. The village was constructed by China in 2020 along the Torsa River.

Media reports in November 2020 said that the village was constructed approximately  within Bhutanese territory without Bhutan's consent based on third-party satellite images. This was later denied by Bhutan and China.

History

Background 

In 2017, Indian and Chinese forces skirmished along the Doklam plateau after Chinese attempts to extend a road across the Doka La stream and towards an Indian border post. After several injuries on both sides, India and China withdrew their forces on 18 August to previously held positions, effectively ending the standoff. Despite the de-escalation, satellite imagery shows that China continued to develop and reinforce the disputed region along the border.

Pangda village 
Satellite images on 28 October 2020 show the village on the banks of the Torsa River. Chinese state media claims that the residents of the new village had moved there as early as September from Shangdui village in Yadong county.

In November 2020, media reports said that the village was constructed approximately  within Bhutanese territory without Bhutan's consent based on third-party open source maps. The reports were denied by the Chinese Ministry of Foreign Affairs, The Bhutanese, and the Bhutanese ambassador to India, who said that "there is no Chinese village inside Bhutan." Following the denial of Pangda's encroachment of the Bhutanese border, Chinese media portrayed the accusations as an attempt by India to sow discord between Bhutan and China and drive a wedge between the two nations.

New construction took place in the village following its initial construction. This primarily consisted of a cluster of 38 new buildings north of the primary settlement and was completed in November 2021. The village was classified as xiaokang, or moderately well-off, according to official Chinese statements.

Geography 
Pangda village was constructed directly on the banks of the Torsa River, 10 km south of any other Chinese settlement in the region. It appears to have been constructed on a sandbank, and is located in a river valley in the Eastern Himalayas. There is one road that leads out of the village, and a small retaining wall was constructed to keep floodwaters out of the village.

Demographics 
According to Chinese state media, there are 27 households in the village and a total of 124 people. There are two administrative buildings in the village, and the villagers are reported to be primarily employed in tourism, fishing, and border patrol.

Map

References 

Bhutan–China border